South Vancouver was a provincial electoral district in the Canadian province of British Columbia.  It first appeared on the hustings in the general election of 1916 (South Vancouver then was incorporated separately from the City of Vancouver).

Following the 1928 election the South Vancouver riding was redistributed.  Parts of it were put in different ridings, principally Vancouver-Point Grey, Vancouver Centre and Vancouver East.

For other current and historical electoral districts in the City of Vancouver, please see Vancouver (electoral districts).

Demographics

Political geography

Notable elections

Notable MLAs

Electoral history 
Note:  Winners in each election are in bold.

|Independent
|John William McIntosh
|align="right"|955 	 	
|align="right"|11.08%
|align="right"|
|align="right"|unknown

|Federated Labour Party
|Robert Henry Neelands
|align="right"|3,255
|align="right"|37.75%
|align="right"|
|align="right"|unknown

|- bgcolor="white"
!align="right" colspan=3|Total valid votes
!align="right"|8,623 
!align="right"|100.00%
!align="right"|
|- bgcolor="white"
!align="right" colspan=3|Total rejected ballots
!align="right"|
!align="right"|
!align="right"|
|- bgcolor="white"
!align="right" colspan=3|Turnout
!align="right"|%
!align="right"|
!align="right"|
|}

 
|Liberal
|Walter John Buckingham
|align="right"|1,141 		
|align="right"|22.43%
|align="right"|
|align="right"|unknown

|Canadian Labour Party
|Robert Henry Neelands
|align="right"|1,971|align="right"|38.74%'|align="right"|
|align="right"|unknown

|- bgcolor="white"
!align="right" colspan=3|Total valid votes
!align="right"|5,088  
!align="right"|100.00%
!align="right"|
|- bgcolor="white"
!align="right" colspan=3|Total rejected ballots
!align="right"|
!align="right"|
!align="right"|
|- bgcolor="white"
!align="right" colspan=3|Turnout
!align="right"|%
!align="right"|
!align="right"|
|}  	  	  	

 
|Liberal
|Charles William Feast
|align="right"|696 	 		
|align="right"|13.47%
|align="right"|
|align="right"|unknown

|Independent
|William Edward Wood Guy
|align="right"|39 	 	 	
|align="right"|0.75%
|align="right"|
|align="right"|unknown

|Independent Labour Party 1
|Robert Henry Neelands
|align="right"|1,981 		
|align="right"|38.33%
|align="right"|
|align="right"|unknown

|- bgcolor="white"
!align="right" colspan=3|Total valid votes
!align="right"|5,168 
!align="right"|100.00%
!align="right"|
|- bgcolor="white"
!align="right" colspan=3|Total rejected ballots
!align="right"|164
!align="right"|
!align="right"|
|- bgcolor="white"
!align="right" colspan=3|Turnout
!align="right"|%
!align="right"|
!align="right"|
|- bgcolor="white"
!align="right" colspan=7|1  Labour in Summary of Votes''
|}

Sources 

Elections BC Historical Returns

Former provincial electoral districts of British Columbia